Llechwedd is Welsh for "hillside" or "slope" and may refer to:

 Llechwedd, Conwy, a village near Conwy, Wales.
 Llechwedd Du, a summit of Esgeiriau Gwynion, Wales.
 Llechwedd quarry, a slate quarry in Blaenau Ffestiniog, Wales.
 Llechwedd Slate Caverns, a visitor attraction in Llechwedd Quarry in Blaenau Ffestiniog, Wales.
 Carnedd Llechwedd-llyfn, a subsidiary summit of Carnedd y Filiast